Schwarzburg-Rudolstadt was a small historic state in present-day Thuringia, Germany, with its capital at Rudolstadt.

History
Schwarzburg-Rudolstadt was established in 1599 in the course of a resettlement of Schwarzburg dynasty lands. Since the 11th century, the ancestral seat of the comital family had been at Schwarzburg Castle, though after 1340, for most of its existence as a polity had the capital at the larger town of Rudolstadt. In 1583 Count Günther XLI of Schwarzburg, the eldest son of Günther XL the Rich and ruler over the united Schwarzburg lands, had died without issue. He was succeeded by his younger brothers, whereby Albert VII received the territory around Rudolstadt. After their brother Count William of Schwarzburg-Frankenhausen had died in 1597, the surviving brothers Albert VII and John Günther I established the two counties of Schwarzburg-Rudolstadt and Schwarzburg-Sondershausen by the 1599 Treaty of Stadtilm.

Albert's descendants ruled as sovereign counts of the Holy Roman Empire. Count Albert Anton (1662–1710) was elevated to the rank of a Prince by Emperor Leopold I of Habsburg; it was however his son Louis Frederick I (1710–1718) who first bore the princely title, whereby Schwarzburg-Rudolstadt in 1711 became a principality under the same entity. It withstood mediatisation and after the Empire's dissolution joined the Confederation of the Rhine in 1807 and the German Confederation in 1815.

On 23 November 1918, during the German Revolution of 1918–1919 and the fall of all the German monarchies, Prince Günther Victor was the last to abdicate. The former principality became a "Free State" in 1919 and joined the Weimar Republic as a constituent state. In 1920, it joined with other small states in the area to form the new state of Thuringia.

Rulers of Schwarzburg-Rudolstadt

Counts of Schwarzburg-Rudolstadt 
 1574–1605: Count Albrecht VII (1537–1605), son of Count Günther XL of Schwarzburg, founder of the county (state) of Schwarzburg-Rudolstadt
 1605–1630: Count Charles Günther I (1576–1630), succeeded by younger brother Louis Günther I
 1612–1634 Count Albrecht Günther (1582–1634)
 1630–1646: Count Louis Günther I (1581–1646)
 1646–1662: Regent Emilie of Oldenburg-Delmenhorst (1614–70)
 1662–1710: Count Albert Anton (1641–1710)

Princes of Schwarzburg-Rudolstadt 

 1710–1718: Prince Louis Frederick I (1667–1718)
 1718–1744: Prince Frederick Anton (1692–1744)
 1744–1767: Prince John Frederick (1721–67)
 1767–1790: Prince Louis Günther II (1708–90)
 1790–1793: Prince Frederick Charles (1736–93)
 1793–1807: Prince Louis Frederick II (1767–1807)
 1807–1814: Regent Caroline Louise of Hesse-Homburg (1771–1854)
 1814–1867: Prince Frederick Günther (1793–1867)
 1867–1869: Prince Albert (1798–1869)
 1869–1890: Prince Georg Albert (1838–90)
 1890–1918: Prince Günther Victor (1852–1925), also succeeded as Prince of Schwarzburg-Sondershausen in 1909 upon the death of Prince Karl Günther.

Heads of the princely house of Schwarzburg post-monarchy 
On the death of the childless Prince Günther Victor in 1925, he was succeeded by Prince Sizzo (1860–1926), who was the son of Prince Friedrich Günther (1793–1867) from his second, morganatic marriage. Prince Sizzo was recognised as a full member of the House of Schwarzburg in 1896. He was succeeded in 1926 by his son, Prince Friedrich Günther (1901–1971).

Upon the death in 1971 of Prince Friedrich Günther, the last in the male line, his elder sister, Princess Marie Antoinette of Schwarzburg, who married Friedrich Magnus V, Count of Solms-Wildenfels, could have had a claim to the headship under semi-Salic primogeniture.

 1918–1925: Prince Günther Victor (1852–1925)
 1925–1926: Prince Sizzo (1860–1926)
 1926–1971: Prince Friedrich Günther (1901–1971)

See also 
 House of Schwarzburg

References

External links 
 House laws of Schwarzburg
 

 
1599 establishments in the Holy Roman Empire
1919 disestablishments in Germany
Rudolstadt
States and territories disestablished in 1919
States and territories established in 1599
States of the Confederation of the Rhine
States of the German Confederation
States of the German Empire
States of the North German Confederation
States of the Weimar Republic